The Commonwealth Bank of Australia (CBA), or CommBank, is an Australian multinational bank with businesses across New Zealand, Asia, the United States and the United Kingdom. It provides a variety of financial services including retail, business and institutional banking, funds management, superannuation, insurance, investment and broking services. The Commonwealth Bank is the largest Australian listed company on the Australian Securities Exchange as of August 2015 with brands including Bankwest, Colonial First State Investments, ASB Bank (New Zealand), Commonwealth Securities (CommSec) and Commonwealth Insurance (CommInsure).

Its former constituent parts were the Commonwealth Trading Bank of Australia, the Commonwealth Savings Bank of Australia, and the Commonwealth Development Bank.

Founded in 1911 by the Australian Government and fully privatised in 1996, the Commonwealth Bank is one of the "big four" Australian banks, with the National Australia Bank (NAB), ANZ and Westpac. The bank was listed on the Australian Stock Exchange on 12 Sep 1991.

The former global headquarters of Commonwealth Bank were the Commonwealth Trading Bank Building on the corner of Pitt Street and Martin Place, Sydney, which was refurbished from 2012 for retail and commercial uses, and (from 1984 to 2012) the State Savings Bank Building on Martin Place, which was sold in 2012 to Macquarie Bank. The headquarters were moved to Tower 1, 201 Sussex Street and two new nine-storey buildings which were built at the site of the former Sega World Sydney, in Darling Harbour on the western side of Sydney's city centre.

In 2018, findings from the Royal Commission into Misconduct in the Banking, Superannuation and Financial Services Industry have indicated a negative culture within the Bank, amid allegations of fraud, deception, and money laundering, among various other crimes.

History

Foundation (1911–1919)

The Commonwealth Bank of Australia was established by the Commonwealth Bank Act 1911, introduced by the Andrew Fisher Labor Government, which favoured bank nationalisation, with effect on 22 December 1911. In a rare move for the time, the bank was to have both savings and general bank business. The bank was also the first bank in Australia to receive a federal government guarantee. The bank's earliest and most strenuous proponent was the flamboyant American-Australian Labor politician, King O'Malley, and its first Governor was Sir Denison Miller.

The bank opened its first branch in Melbourne on 15 July 1912. In an agreement with Australia Post that exists to this day, the bank also traded through post office agencies. In 1912, it took over the State Savings Bank of Tasmania, and by 1913 it had branches in all six states.

In 1916, the bank moved its head office to Sydney. It also followed the Australian army into New Guinea, where it opened a branch in Rabaul and agencies elsewhere.

Central bank (1920–1959)

In 1920, the bank began acquiring central bank powers when it took over the responsibility for the issue of Australian bank notes from the Department of the Treasury. Also in 1920, the Commonwealth Bank took over the Queensland Government Savings Bank.

In 1924, the federal government of Stanley Bruce sought to place further checks and limits on the powers of the governor of the bank, and passed the  Commonwealth Bank Act, 1924, which created a seven-member Board of Directors comprising the Governor, the Secretary of the Treasury, and six directors "actively engaged in agriculture, commerce, finance or industry", and a Chairman of the Board elected annual from its members. The first six board members was appointed on 10 October 1924: Sir John Garvan, Sir Robert Gibson, Sir Samuel Hordern, Robert McComas, Richard Samuel Drummond, and John McKenzie Lees. Garvan was appointed as the first chairman on 13 October 1924.

In 1931, the bank board came into conflict with the Labor government of James Scullin. The bank's chairman Sir Robert Gibson refused to expand credit in response to the Great Depression, as had been proposed by Treasurer Edward Theodore unless the government cut pensions, which Scullin refused to do. The conflict surrounding this issue led to the fall of the government, and to demands from Labor for reform of the bank and more direct government control over monetary policy.

Also in 1931, it took over the savings bank business of the Government Savings Bank of New South Wales (est. 1871), the current account and fixed deposit business of the NSW Rural Bank Department, and the State Savings Bank of Western Australia (est. 1863).

In 1942, the Commonwealth Banking Corporation (CBC) suspended its operations in Papua New Guinea as the Imperial Japanese Army captured many of the towns in which it operated, and bombed Port Moresby. The bank resumed operations later, possibly in 1944.

The bank had many branches across Papua New Guinea including Port Moresby, Boroko, Rabaul, Lae, Wau, Bulolo, Goroka, Kavieng, Madang, Mount Hagen, Kundiawa, Popondetta, and Wewak. On Bougainville, there was Kieta, Panguna, Arawa and early on a part-time sub-branch at Loloho. It maintained those facilities to support trade, local business, government, and small savers.

The Commonwealth Bank received almost all central bank powers in emergency legislation passed during World War II and at the end of the war, it used this power to begin a dramatic expansion of the economy. This was also the aim of the federal government at the time, which attempted to compel the Australian states to conduct their banking with the Commonwealth under the Banking Act 1945 (Cth), but the High Court in Melbourne Corporation v Commonwealth (1947) 74 CLR 31, blocked this move.

In August 1945, the federal government of Ben Chifley passed the Commonwealth Bank Act, 1945, which repealed the 1925 act and abolished the Board of Directors, returning full executive control of the bank to the Governor.

The government also dramatically expanded immigration programs. In response, the bank established a Migrant Information Service (later known as the Australian Financial & Migrant Information Service, or AFMIS). The bank expanded during this period, and in just five years it opened hundreds of branches throughout Australia and in 1951 it established a branch in the Solomon Islands.

In 1958 and 1959, there was a controversy concerning the dual functions of the organization, operating as the central bank on the one hand and a commercial bank on the other. As a result, the government separated the two roles, creating the Reserve Bank of Australia to exercise the central bank function, and leaving the Commonwealth Banking Corporation to operate purely as a commercial bank. Those commercial functions were exercised by the organization's constituent sections: the Commonwealth Trading Bank of Australia, the Commonwealth Savings Bank of Australia, and the newly-formed Commonwealth Development Bank.

From 1958 to 1976 the Commonwealth Bank operated savings bank agencies in the New Hebrides.

Diversification (1960–1991)

A new Commonwealth Development Bank was established in 1960 and during the 1970s the bank diversified its business into areas like insurance and travel. It established a finance company, CBFC in 1974. The bank also became more heavily involved in foreign currency trading and international banking in general.

The bank actively supported the introduction of decimal currency in the years leading up to 1966 and, like most banks, it gradually converted its paper records onto a new computer-based system. The bank created the first credit card in Australia in 1974 when it established Bankcard. In later years the bank began offering MasterCard (1984) and Visa (1993) cards as well.

In 1974, as Papua New Guinea approached independence, the bank formally handed over its PNG operations to the newly created and government-owned Papua New Guinea Banking Corporation (PNGBC).  The bank retained a restricted branch in Port Moresby that it finally closed in 1982.

In 1981 the bank transferred its operations in the Solomon Islands to the National Bank of Solomon Islands, which operated as a joint venture (51% Commonwealth Bank, 49% Government of the Solomon Islands).

In 1989 the bank acquired 75 per cent of ASB Bank in New Zealand.

In 1991 the bank acquired the failing Victorian Government-owned State Bank of Victoria (est. 1842).

Privatisation (1991–present)

Between 1991 and 1996 the Australian Government under the Keating government fully privatised the Commonwealth Bank. The first share offer in 1991 was valued at $1,292 million, the second in 1993 for $1,700 million and the third was sold for $5,000 million in 1996. It is a public company, but one of the few such companies in Australia whose official name does not end in 'Limited'.

In 1994 Commonwealth sold its shares in National Bank of Solomon Islands to Bank of Hawaii. In 1994, Commonwealth took a 50% share in PT Bank International Indonesia.

On 10 March 2000, the Commonwealth Bank and Colonial Limited announced their intention to merge, with seven Commonwealth Bank shares being offered for twenty Colonial Shares. The merger received final approval from the Supreme Court of Victoria on 31 May 2000 and was completed on 13 June 2000. This brought into the fold Colonial’s stake in Colonial National Bank, the former National Bank of Fiji. The bank also acquired the remaining 25% of ASB Bank.

Banking opportunities in Asia saw the Bank in 2000 acquire full ownership of PT Bank International Indonesia and rename it (PT Bank Commonwealth). This bank now has over 16 branches and has opened several FX shops to cater to Commonwealth Bank clients who are tourists in Bali.

In 2005, the bank established strategic co-operation agreements with two Chinese banks, Jinan City Commercial Bank and Hangzhou City Commercial Bank; it took an 11% stake in Jinan Commercial, and a 19.9% stake in Hangzhuo Commercial. Commonwealth also established a representative office in Bangalore, India.

On 27 January 2006, the bank acquired the remaining 49% stake in Colonial National Bank (Fiji).

At the beginning of 2008, Commonwealth Bank opened a branch in Ho Chi Minh City (Saigon). Then in October, Commonwealth announced that it had purchased Bankwest and St Andrew's Insurances from their parent company HBOS plc for A$2.1 billion. The acquisition was scheduled to be completed in early 2009, subject to regulatory approval. Lastly, on 24 December, Commonwealth announced that it had, in joint partnership with Aussie Home Loans, purchased Wizard Home Loans. As part of the deal, the Commonwealth Bank will acquire Wizard mortgages up to the value of A$4 billion. The Commonwealth Bank currently owns an 80% stake in Aussie. Commonwealth Bank held about 30 percent of the loan business of financial advisory company Storm Financial when it collapsed in January 2009.

In December 2009, Commonwealth sold Colonial National Bank to Bank of South Pacific.

The bank transferred their ATM service desk from HP Enterprise Services in Adelaide to ITS (Armaguard) in Sydney from March 2012. The bank will change from NCR and Diebold ATMs to Wincor Nixdorf ATMs over the coming years.

The bank is the only financial services organisation to appear in the Dream Employers' top 20 list of preferred employers for 2010 and 2011.

During the Royal Commission into Misconduct in the Banking, Superannuation and Financial Services Industry it was discovered that the Commonwealth Bank had charged dead people for financial advice services. On 9 May 2018, Commonwealth Bank settled an interest rate rigging case brought by ASIC for $25 million. In the settlement, the bank admitted it engaged in "unconscionable conduct" and manipulated the bank bill swap rate five times between February and June 2012.

Controversies

Environmental
Commonwealth Bank is one of the major Australian banks known to be financing and profiting from activities destructive to the Great Barrier Reef, something the bank has been facing increased public scrutiny over since a 2013 report by Market Forces; the Sydney Morning Herald had this to say:

In 2014, CBA and the big four Australian banks faced increased pressure to end their support for reef-threatening mining projects, as surveys have shown that "the big four banks would be risking customers shifting up to $236 billion in household deposits if they were to finance a project like the Abbot Point expansion".

In late 2014, it "was revealed [CBA] was advising Indian coal miner Adani on its proposed development in Queensland's Galilee basin", while by 2015, it has been reported that "all the major American and European banks have refused funds to the project, citing environmental damage".

In May 2015, a report by Market Forces showed that CBA is the single biggest lender to fossil fuel projects within the Great Barrier Reef World Heritage Area during the six-year period from 2008 to 2014. Almost immediately following, protests were held at over fifty CBA branches in Australia and around the world.  Billboards, hoardings and branch signs were revised to read "Coal Bank" and company slogans changed to highlight its investment in fossil fuels.

Later in May, a report by MSCI showed that while other banks are reducing their funding for fossil fuel projects, Australia's largest banks are ramping up this same funding; The Guardian reported:

{{block quote|Australia's largest banks have committed about 10% of their known loan arrangements to the financing of risky fossil fuel projects that may become 'stranded' if the world is to avoid disastrous climate change, new research has estimated.|The Guardian, May 2015.}}

2008 financial planning scandal
In October 2008, former CBA financial planner Jeff Morris alleged to the Australian Securities and Investments Commission (ASIC) and subsequently a Senate Inquiry, the extent of the misconduct of CBA's financial planning arm, Commonwealth Financial Planning Limited (CFPL), but it was not until 16 months later that ASIC would launch an investigation. "There was forgery and dishonest concealment of material facts," the Senate Inquiry found in its report. They concluded a Royal Commission or Judicial Inquiry as it was deemed ASIC lacked the investigative powers required to uncover the full extent of the allegations. A week following the Senate Inquiry, CEO Ian Narev publicly apologised while announcing a compensation scheme. Former CEO Ralph Norris also conceded that he was aware of problems within CFPL acknowledging the presence of rogue financial planners but rejected the assertion of a conspiracy to cover it up. CBA has been criticised in the Senate for appointing Dr. Brendan French, who was the General Manager of Group Customer Relations before, as the head of the Open Advice Review program. The CBA defended Dr. Brendan French successfully in a defamation lawsuit in 2015; the decision was a single judge decision and was not appealed after the defence was withdrawn. Criticism has also been leveled at the fact that Dr. Brendan French was formerly a member of the board of directors of the Financial Ombudsman Service and is now working in CBA with respect to customer complaints.

2016 $76m Ponzi scheme
In 2016, it was revealed that some CBA staff were implicated in an alleged $76m Ponzi scheme fraud. The alleged architects of the scam were professional poker player Bill Jordanou and accountant Robert Zaia.

Insurance division scandal
It was reported alleged systemic issues about the insurance division of CBA. A claimant who suffered a heart attack and nearly died had his claim declined based on an outdated medical definition in his insurance policy. The company admitted this decision was a bad judgement. The insurer also "refused to pay total permanent disability (TPD) and terminal illness claims on the chance that a dying person facing organ failure may have their life saved by a transplant, and that a person can claim their life insurance if they are declared terminally ill by two doctors and deemed likely to die within 12 months." In March 2016, ASIC announced it would be investigating CBA about the allegations. After the serious allegations were aired in an episode of Four Corners'' two parliamentary inquiries were conducted. One into the life insurance sector, and another into protection of whistleblowers. The inquiries found that no staff involved in the wrongdoings were fired. The only person who suffered a consequence was the whistleblower who had tried to do the right thing. There were also calls for a Royal Commission into the insurance industry. The Financial Services Royal Commission was eventually called and found widespread issues. The Commonwealth Bank was called the gold medallist for ripping off customers by the counsel assisting the royal commissioner.

Money laundering scandal
In August 2017, the financial intelligence agency Australian Transaction Reports and Analysis Centre (AUSTRAC) launched civil proceedings in the Federal Court of Australia, alleging that CBA had breached money laundering and terrorism financing laws on 53,700 occasions. The breaches related to the bank's use of intelligent deposit machines (IDMs) between November 2012 and September 2015—the bank claimed that a programming error allowed depositors to instantly credit cash deposits to their accounts, whilst failing to report amounts over $10,000 to AUSTRAC, and not enforcing any limits to the number of transactions.

Bank bill swap rate allegations

ASIC commenced legal proceedings in the Federal Court on 30 January 2018 alleging manipulation of the bank bill swap rate (BBSW). The BBSW rate is the rate of interest that banks charge to lend money to each other, and is a key interest rate used as the benchmark for interest rates on a number of products, most notably business loans, currency derivatives and floating rate bonds. It is alleged that the manipulations took place on three specific occasions in 2012.

BankWest commercial loan book
The change from Basel I to Basel II capitalisation requirements, due to take effect on 1 January 2009, required BankWest to increase its Tier 1 capital (share capital) by an additional A$17 billion. BankWest's owner HBOS lent this money to Bankwest, but required the money be repaid to meet HBOS's own capital requirements.

HBOS, therefore, agreed to sell BankWest to Commonwealth Bank (CBA) in October 2008. The sale completed on for A$2.1 billion on 19 December 2008, and required Commonwealth Bank to repay the capital HBOS had loaned Bankwest.

One of the provisions of the sale agreement was an ability for CBA to claim a price adjustment a loan was later found to have been impaired at the time of purchase but had not been identified to Commonwealth Bank by HBOS as impaired during the acquisition.

Commonwealth Bank declared 1,958 out of 26,000 BankWest commercial loans impaired (in default of the loan terms), with a total face value of $17.9 billion. As they were deemed to be in breach of their loan conditions, the bank was able to charge increased interest rates, or require early repayment.

Commonwealth Bank lost A$2 billion on defaulted loans that were not repaid (2.1% of the loan book, in comparison to an average of 0.4% across the Big Four Australian banks). Of the defaulted loans, the calling-in of 117 resulted in the borrowing company going into receivership.

Borrowers complained that they had complied with the monetary conditions of the loans: they had kept up interest payments and repayments, and disputed whether it was reasonable to apply penalty interest and require early repayment for non-monetary issues (for example, not having invested the funds for the purpose borrowed, or no longer having adequate security to back the loan).

The Australian Parliament requested that the Parliament's Joint Committee on Corporations and Financial Services conduct an inquiry into the matter, which reported on 4 May 2016.

The committee concluded that there was no evidence to suggest that impairment of loans was related to an attempt to 'claw back' any of the BankWest purchase price. However, it did find that "in a minority of cases" there was abuse of the asymmetry of power between the bank and the borrower. The committee recommended that there be improvements in the consistency of lenders' valuation of property used as security for loans.

Dollarmites
Dollarmites is the Commonwealth Bank's school banking program.  In a 2020 Report, the Australian Securities and Investments Commission recommended against these programs.
The Victorian Government and later the Queensland Government planned to stop allowing these programs in their state schools. Consumer group Choice continued to lobby for more State governments to also ban the banking program from public schools.
Finally in 2021, after the New South Wales Government banned it too, the Commonwealth Bank announced the end of the program.

Bank structure

Customer Service Network

This division delivers financial services to personal and small business customers.

Premium Business Services
Premium Business Services was formally split into two departments in 2009, Institutional Banking & Markets (IB&M) and Business & Private Banking (B&PB). IB&M includes areas of the bank that provides services to Institutional Clients and Global Markets. B&PB includes areas of the bank that provides services to Business customers and private banking customers.

Wealth Management
Wealth Management brings together the Groups funds management platform, master funds, superannuation, insurance and financial advice business support. Colonial First State, Colonial First State Global Asset Management and CommInsure all form part of Wealth Management. CBA has been granted a MySuper authority, enabling it to continue to receive default superannuation contribution from 1 January 2014.

Executive leadership

Governors/Chief Executive Officers
The following individuals have been appointed to serve as chief executive of the Commonwealth Bank of Australia, or precursor titles:

Chairs of the Board

International operations
The Commonwealth Bank's international presence includes:
 Retail banks in New Zealand (ASB Bank) and Indonesia (99% of PT Bank Commonwealth)
 Banking investments in China (20 per cent in both Qilu Bank and Bank of Hangzhou) and Vietnam, (20 per cent stake in Vietnam International Bank)
 County banks in Hebei and Henen Provinces of China (15 branches and 8 sub-branches)
 Commonwealth Bank branches in London, New York City, Tokyo, Hong Kong, Shanghai, Beijing, Singapore, Auckland, Ho Chi Minh City and Mumbai
 Joint venture life insurance businesses in Indonesia (PT Commonwealth Life) and China (37.5% stake in BoCommLife)
 First State funds management business in the United Kingdom, Germany, France, Hong Kong, Singapore, Indonesia, Japan, United States and Dubai
 Representative office in Hanoi
 A Global Capability Center in Bangalore, India

Products and services
The Commonwealth Bank is Australia's largest retail bank and offers customers a range of products and services, including loans, credit cards, transaction and savings accounts. It has the largest branch and ATM network. It also offers services to people planning to move to Australia.

NetBank
The Commonwealth Bank offers online banking services through NetBank. NetBank allows customers to transfer funds, manage accounts, access assets and liabilities and also manage savings and saving goals. NetBank is also offered with a mobile app available for iOS and Android.

Beem It
Beem It is an instant payment free-to-download mobile application owned by Commonwealth Bank, NAB and Westpac later sold to Eftpos Australia. It offers an instant payment transfer service between registered users of the app regardless of which bank they are with. The app's main features include options to pay, transfer, request and split money.

Subsidiaries

Australia
 Bankwest
 Colonial First State
 CommInsure
 Commonwealth Securities

Asia Pacific
 PT Bank Commonwealth (Indonesia)

New Zealand
 ASB

See also

 Australian Cricket Academy
 Banking in Australia
 Commonwealth Bank Series
 Commonwealth Bank Trophy
 List of banks in Australia
 List of banks in Oceania
 List of companies of Australia
 Reserve Bank of Australia
 State Bank of New South Wales
 State Bank of Victoria

References

Further reading

External links

 
 
 
 
 
 

 
1991 initial public offerings
Australian companies established in 1911
Banks established in 1911
Banks of Australia
Companies listed on the Australian Securities Exchange
Financial services companies based in Sydney
Former Commonwealth Government-owned companies of Australia
Multinational banks